The Separate Special Purpose Battalion of the Ministry of Defense of the Chechen Republic of Ichkeria is a military commando formation of Chechen volunteers, functioning as part of the International Legion of Territorial Defense of Ukraine. It is one of several Chechen armed volunteer formations on the side of Ukraine It was created by Akhmed Zakayev on July 29, 2022, on the basis of a Chechen formation that has been fighting on the side of the Armed Forces of Ukraine since Russia's full-scale invasion of Ukraine.

History 
On July 29, 2022, at a meeting with the leaders of the Chechen volunteers in Kyiv, Akhmed Zakayev announced the creation of a new Chechen armed formation on the side of the armed forces of Ukraine.

This formation was named OBON (Separate Special Purpose Battalion) and included in the International Legion of Territorial Defense of Ukraine. According to Zakayev himself, as the battalion becomes bigger, it will be transformed into a "Separate Special Purpose Brigade" as part of the International Legion.

The unit is subordinate to the Ministry of Defense of the government of the Chechen Republic of Ichkeria abroad, headed by Akhmed Zakayev. It includes fighters from among the representatives of the Chechen nationality who serve in the Ukrainian army, as well as volunteers from the Chechen diaspora in Europe and abroad.

The officer of the Ukrainian army Khadzhi-Murat Zumsoevsky who served for several years in the ranks of the armed forces of Ukraine was appointed as the commander of the battalion. His deputy is Khavazhi Amaev, a participant in the second Russian-Chechen war and civil war in Syria.

Participation in the Russo-Ukrainian war 
In the beginning of August, the battalion took part in the battles in the Donetsk region of Ukraine. In August–September 2022, the battalion has taken part in the Ukrainian counteroffensive of the southern regions.

Commanders 
 Rustam Azhiev – colonel of the CRI Armed Forces
 Hadji-Murad Zumso – Battalion commander  
 Khavazhi Amaev – Deputy battalion commander
 Hussein Dzhambetov – Commander of a group in the battalion
 Muslim Sadaev – Captain of the CRI Armed Forces

See also 
 Sheikh Mansur Battalion
 Dzhokhar Dudayev Battalion
 Ukrainian volunteer battalions 
 2022 Russian invasion of Ukraine 
 Russo-Ukrainian War

References

Regiments of the International Legion of Territorial Defense of Ukraine
Battalions of Ukraine
Chechen armies in exile